Poshteh-ye Barjan (also Romanized as Poshteh-ye Bārjān; also known as Posht-e Mārjān) is a village in Amjaz Rural District, in the Central District of Anbarabad County, Kerman Province, Iran. At the 2006 census, its population was 36, in 7 families.

References 

Populated places in Anbarabad County